Major affective disorder 1 is a protein that in humans is encoded by the MAFD1 gene.

References

Further reading